Sardis is a home rule-class city in Mason and Robertson counties in the U.S. state of Kentucky. The population was 103 at the year 2010 U.S. Census.

Geography
Sardis is located at  (38.534261, -83.957454).

The Mason County portion of Sardis is part of the Maysville micropolitan area.

Demographics

As of the census of 2000, there were 149 people, 58 households, and 36 families residing in the city. The racial makeup of the city was 99.33% White, and 0.67% from two or more races.

There were 58 households, out of which 27.6% had children under the age of 18 living with them, 37.9% were married couples living together, 20.7% had a female householder with no husband present, and 37.9% were non-families. 31.0% of all households were made up of individuals, and 17.2% had someone living alone who was 65 years of age or older. The average household size was 2.50 and the average family size was 3.08.

In the city, the population was spread out, with 21.5% under the age of 18, 12.1% from 18 to 24, 24.2% from 25 to 44, 21.5% from 45 to 64, and 20.8% who were 65 years of age or older. The median age was 42 years. For every 100 females, there were 75.3 males. For every 100 females age 18 and over, there were 72.1 males.

The median income for a household in the city was $14,886, and the median income for a family was $27,917. Males had a median income of $22,188 versus $14,375 for females. The per capita income for the city was $9,881. There were 14.3% of families and 31.6% of the population living below the poverty line, including 40.0% of under eighteens and 36.0% of those over 64.

References

Cities in Mason County, Kentucky
Cities in Robertson County, Kentucky
Cities in Kentucky
Maysville, Kentucky micropolitan area